Hermann Karsten may refer to:

 Gustav Karl Wilhelm Hermann Karsten (1817–1908), German botanist and geologist
 Hermann Karsten (physicist) (1809–1877), German physicist and mineralogist